Eileen Conn is an American television producer and television writer. Her credits include Get a Life, Mad About You, Dream On, NewsRadio, Just Shoot Me!, DAG (also co-creator), Courting Alex and serving as executive producer for Shake It Up (in which her husband has appeared) alongside Rob Lotterstein and Made in Japan.

In 1993, Conn married actor-comedian Larry Miller, with whom she has two children.

References

External links

American television producers
American women television producers
American television writers
Living people
American women television writers
Place of birth missing (living people)
Year of birth missing (living people)
20th-century American screenwriters
20th-century American women writers
21st-century American screenwriters
21st-century American women writers